Ectopatria virginea is a moth of the family Noctuidae. It is found in South Australia.

Original Description

References

External links
Australian Faunal Directory
Descriptions of new Australian lepidoptera with synonymic notes.- no. Xxiii

Moths of Australia
Noctuinae
Moths described in 1905